Devaroe Lawrence (born October 13, 1992) is an American football defensive tackle who is a free agent. He played college football at Auburn and signed with the New Orleans Saints as an undrafted free agent in 2017. Lawrence has also been a member of the Cleveland Browns, Kansas City Chiefs, and Washington Football Team.

Early life and high school
Lawrence was born and grew up in Greenville, South Carolina and attended Carolina Academy. His biological father was absent from his life and his mother abandoned him at the age of 12 after giving him to another couple in an unofficial adoption. He dealt drugs starting in eight grade and was served a two week jail sentence while in high school, with two more stints in jail shortly after his graduation. Lawrence was later taken in by Sam Kelly, one of the assistant coaches at Carolina Academy, who employed him at his software company.

College career
Having had no offers to play college football out of high school due to poor academic performance and his legal issues, Lawrence initially took courses at Greenville Technical College. Participated in an open tryout Georgia Military College's football team and was offered a spot on the team as a walk-on, despite having been overweight and not having played the sport in over two years. He redshirted his freshman year in order to get into shape. He committed to Auburn over offers from Southern Miss and West Virginia going into his redshirt freshman season. He tallied 20 tackles and 4.5 sacks in his only season of play for the Bulldogs.

Lawrence then played three seasons for the Tigers. He appeared in four games with one tackle, which was for a loss, in his first season with the team before entering the regular defensive line rotation as a redshirt junior. Lawrence played in all 13 of Auburn's games as a redshirt junior, making 31 tackles, two for a loss, and half of a sack. In his final season, Lawrence played in 11 games, recording 13 tackles, three for a loss, and one sack. He tore his ACL in his final career game. Lawrence finished his Auburn career with 45 total tackles with six tackles for loss and 1.5 sacks in 28 games played.

Professional career

New Orleans Saints
Lawrence was signed by the New Orleans Saints as an undrafted free agent on May 1, 2017. He spent the 2017 season on injured reserve while he recovered from his ACL tear.

Cleveland Browns

Lawrence was traded to the Cleveland Browns on September 1, 2018 for a 2019 seventh-round draft pick. Lawrence made his NFL debut on September 9, 2018 during the Browns season opener against the Pittsburgh Steelers. He was waived by the Browns on October 4, 2018 and was re-signed to the practice squad. The Browns signed Lawrence to a futures contract on January 2, 2019.

On November 26, 2019, Lawrence was waived by the Browns. He had eight tackles with a fumble recovery and an interception in 11 games played with two starts with the Browns at the time of his release.

Kansas City Chiefs
On November 30, 2019, Lawrence was signed to the Kansas City Chiefs practice squad. Lawrence remained on the practice squad for the rest of the 2019 season, including during the Chiefs Super Bowl LIV victory. He re-signed with the Chiefs on February 5, 2020. He was waived during final roster cuts on September 5, 2020.

Washington Football Team
On September 30, 2020, Lawrence signed with the Washington Football Team's practice squad. He was elevated to the active roster on October 24 for the team's week 7 game against the Dallas Cowboys, and reverted to the practice squad after the game. Lawrence signed a reserve/futures contract with Washington on January 11, 2021, but was released on August 31, 2021.

References

External links 
Auburn Tigers bio

1992 births
Living people
Sportspeople from Greenville, South Carolina
Players of American football from South Carolina
American football defensive tackles
Auburn Tigers football players
New Orleans Saints players
Cleveland Browns players
Kansas City Chiefs players
Washington Football Team players